Gerard Lawson (born January 12, 1985) is a former American football cornerback/kickoff returner He was signed by the Cleveland Browns as an undrafted free agent in 2008. He played college football at Oregon State. He also participated in the 2007 Hula Bowl All Star game where he was awarded the Most Valuable Player Award.

Lawson has also played for the Hartford Colonials, Philadelphia Eagles and BC Lions.

Professional career

Cleveland Browns
Lawson was signed to a one-year contract by the Cleveland Browns as an undrafted free agent following the 2008 NFL Draft on April 28, 2008. He played in 20 games for the Browns from 2008–2009, making five special teams tackles and four kickoff returns for 115 yards.

Hartford Colonials
Lawson played with the Hartford Colonials of the United Football League in 2010 following his release from the Browns. He returned an interception 41 yards for a touchdown in his debut for the Colonials, and had 23 kickoff returns for 483 yards during the season.

Philadelphia Eagles
Lawson was signed to a three-year contract by the Philadelphia Eagles on December 24, 2010, to replace Jorrick Calvin, who was placed on injured reserve. He was released on July 28, 2011.

BC Lions
Lawson was signed by the BC Lions on April 24, 2012. He was released by the Lions on June 16, 2013.

References

External links

BC Lions bio
Philadelphia Eagles bio
Cleveland Browns bio

1985 births
Living people
People from the Las Vegas Valley
Players of American football from Nevada
American football cornerbacks
American football return specialists
Oregon State Beavers football players
Cleveland Browns players
Hartford Colonials players
Philadelphia Eagles players
BC Lions players
Palo Verde High School alumni